Samuele Romanini (born 22 September 1976) is an Italian bobsledder who has competed since 2001. He won a bronze medal in the two-man event at the 2007 FIBT World Championships in St. Moritz.

Romanini also competed in two Winter Olympics, earning his best finish of tied for ninth in the four-man event in Vancouver in 2010.

References
 Bobsleigh two-man world championship medalists since 1931
 
 

1976 births
Bobsledders at the 2006 Winter Olympics
Bobsledders at the 2010 Winter Olympics
Bobsledders at the 2014 Winter Olympics
Italian male bobsledders
Living people
Olympic bobsledders of Italy
Bobsledders of Fiamme Oro